Thesara Jayawardane (Sinhala:තෙසාරා ජයවර්ධන) is a Sri Lankan film and teledrama actress, singer, dancer
, TV Presenter and author.

Personal life
Thesara is married to Jeeth Sumedha Samarasekara. The wedding was celebrated at Eagles Lake Side Banquet & Conventional Hall in Attidiya, Ratmalana.

Beyond acting
Thesara is a full-time Senior Lecturer at the University of Moratuwa and is also a visiting Lecturer at the University of Sri Jayewardenepura, Chartered Accountants of Sri Lanka (CASL), Edulink Campus, Imperial Institute of Higher Education, Saegis Campus and CFPS Law School.

She has won the World Prize for her academic achievements in marketing in 2012. This award was presented to her for the outstanding Performance at the Postgraduate Diploma in Marketing conducted by the Chartered Institute of Marketing (UK).

Career
She won OCIC / SIGNIS tele Award for Best Actress 2008 and the Best Supporting Actress Award in the State National Tele Drama Awards (Rajya Sammana Ulela) for her outstanding role as Fathima in "East is Calling". (Sinhala:නැගෙනහිර වෙරළෙන් ඇසෙනා)
.

Television
Her maiden teledrama acting came through Athbhutha Laampuwa directed by Bennette Ratnayake.

Selected television serials

 Ataka Nataka
 Athbhutha Laampuwa
 Dhawala Yamaya
 Hima Kandulu
 Kapa Nasna Samaya
 Kekiri
 Meedum Seveneli
 Mihidum Sihina 
 Nagenahira Weralin Asena as Fathima
 Pas Mal Pethi
 Pathihi
 Rangana Vijithaya
 Sabanda Babanis as Simona
 Sabanda Eliyes as Komali
 Sakisanda Suwaris as Simona
 Samanaliyak Iki binda
 Sanda Biligath Raththriya
 Sandali Saha Radika as Radika
 Situ Gedara
 Sneha as Sakuni
 Wasuda

Filmography
Her maiden cinema acting came through 2006 film Sihina Devduwa directed by Suresh Kumarasinghe.

Bibliography

References

External links
Thesara Jayawardane's latest teledrama 'Sneha' all episodes on tharunaya teledrama.

Living people
Sri Lankan film actresses
Sri Lankan television actresses
Alumni of Visakha Vidyalaya
Sinhalese actresses
New Zealand people of Sri Lankan descent
Year of birth missing (living people)
21st-century Sri Lankan actresses
Sri Lankan notaries